The International Academy of Trenton (IAT) was a SABIS charter school in the city of Trenton, New Jersey. It was the only school in the now defunct International Academy of Trenton School District, which was a separate governing body from Trenton Public Schools.  The school was planned to become a kindergarten through 12th grade school. 

On January 12, 2018, parents received a letter stating that the New Jersey Department of Education had decided to not renew IAT's charter, citing poor academic performance, causing a closure by the end of the current school year. IAT officially closed on June 30, 2018, the last day of school for students being June 27.

History
The International Academy of Trenton was opened on September 8 2014. Anthony Degatano became the director of the school, with students in grades K-3. The goal was to add one grade every school year, ultimately becoming a K-12 school.

The school took PARCC tests for grades 3 and up in mathematics and English. It took NJASK tests for grade 4 in only science.

Closure
On January 12, 2018, parents received a letter from the school director, Dominique Taylor, stating that, "we have been informed that the New Jersey Department of Education has decided not to renew IAT's charter. If this decision stands, IAT will have no choice but to close at the end of the current school year. The IAT Board is exploring all of its options to seek a reconsideration of this decision. We will continue to be in contact with you over the next few weeks and in order to provide you with up-to-date information related to the future of IAT." The school was not successful with the appeal. 

On February 14, 2018, the New Jersey Department of Education mailed a letter to IAT parents written by the Office of Project Management Director James Palmer. In the letter, Palmer said that "as a result [of the decision to not renew IAT's charter], IAT will close as of June 30, 2018." The letter also mentioned that the Department came to the decision to close IAT after "careful review and consideration in accordance with N.J.S.A. 18A:36A-17, N.J.A.C. 6A:11-2.3, and N.J.A.C. 6A:11-2.4. The Department is working with the Executive County Superintendent of Mercer County, as well as administrators from Trenton Public Schools, Ewing Public Schools, and area charter schools, to ensure a smooth transition for each student from IAT to a new school for the 2018-2019 school year." 

IAT was permanently closed on June 30, 2018.

Campuses

The final campus on Perry Street was formerly the Trenton Times' headquarters. The original building located on Bellevue Ave was an old elementary school that had been abandoned for many years. There was a year of remodeling before the 2014-2015 school year started. The school relocated to an old high school on Chancery Lane near the New Jersey State House. The charter school served for children from kindergarten to 6th grade in 2017 and 2018 in both Ewing and Trenton, New Jersey.

Bellevue Avenue Campus (2014-2015 and 2016-2017)

The school's Bellevue campus was home to the first year of the International Academy of Trenton. It was formerly a school abandoned for many years. The school was not used in the 2015-2016 school year, because the school was using the St. Mary's school on North Chancery Lane. In the 2016-2017 school year, the school used both the campus at Bellevue Ave and Chancery Lane. The Bellevue Ave campus housed grades K-2. In late February 2017, teachers and students left the campus for the new building at Perry Street.

Construction started on the new school building where the Trenton Times Newspaper Headquarters was located on Perry Street at 500 Perry Street Trenton, NJ. The school moved in on February 21, 2017.

Local charter school STEMCivics eventually used the building beginning in September 2018 for its middle school, PURPLEfect Parc.

North Chancery Lane Campus (2015-2017) 

International Academy of Trenton moved into the former St. Mary's school in 2015. The school was an old high school, part of the St. Mary's Cathedral next door. The building took some remodeling to be ready for the 2015-2016 school year. During that school year, the building was home to all of the grades at the time, K-4. It was used again during the 2016-2017 school year. In February 2017, the school moved to the new Perry Street campus.

Perry Street Campus (2017-2018) 
The International Academy of Trenton Charter School's 6 acre Perry Street Campus, formerly the Trenton Times headquarters, was finished in early 2017. This was the first phase of the plan for the building. All of the teachers and students moved from the Chancery Lane campus (grades 3-5) and from the Bellevue Ave campus (grades K-2) to the Perry Street campus on February 21, 2017. An inauguration for the staff of the school was held February 22, 2017 while students stayed home. Trenton Mayor Eric Jackson went to the inauguration of the school. The school opened its Perry Street doors to students on February 23, 2017. The building took almost two years to remodel. Walls and floors were removed, graffiti was removed, and new staircases were added. The work was completed by Hollister Construction Services. The gymnasium was completed on April 3, 2017. The second phase of the plan for the building includes the renovation of some sections of the basement, which never began due to its closure in June 2018. The school's name on the right side of the building was added in mid April 2017. IAT closed on June 30, 2018. The Perry Street building will become the 9th Grade Academy, a part of Trenton Central High School.

References

Schools in New Jersey
Charter schools in New Jersey
Trenton, New Jersey
Educational institutions established in 2014
2014 establishments in New Jersey
Educational institutions disestablished in 2018
2018 disestablishments in New Jersey